The Kylfings (Old Norse Kylfingar; Estonian Kalevid; Hungarian Kölpények; Old East Slavic Колбяги, Kolbiagi; Byzantine Greek Κουλπίγγοι, Koulpingoi; Arabic al-Kilabiyya) were a people of uncertain origin active in Northern Europe during the Viking Age, roughly from the late ninth century to the early twelfth century. They could be found in areas of Lapland, Russia, and the Byzantine Empire that were frequented by Scandinavian traders, raiders and mercenaries. Scholars differ on whether the Kylfings were ethnically Finnic or Norse. Also disputed is their geographic origin, with Denmark, Sweden and the Eastern Baltic all put forward as candidates. Whether the name Kylfing denotes a particular tribal, socio-political, or economic grouping is also a matter of much debate.

They are mentioned in Old Norse runestone inscriptions, sagas (most notably in Egil's Saga), and poetry (such as Thorbjorn Hornklofi's poem Haraldskvæði), as well as Byzantine records and Rus' law-codes. According to the sagas, the Kylfings opposed the consolidation of Norway under Harald Fairhair and participated in the pivotal late ninth century Battle of Hafrsfjord. After Harald's victory in that battle, they are described in the sagas as having raided in Finnmark and elsewhere in northern Norway and having fought against Harald's lieutenants such as Thorolf Kveldulfsson.

Etymology
The exact etymology of the word kylfing is disputed and many different theories have been put forward as to its ultimate origin. The general trend has been to trace kylfing to the Old Norse words kylfa and kolfr, but scholars disagree as to the meaning of these words as well. Cleasby notes that in Old Norse, kylfa can mean a club or cudgel. Thus the national Icelandic antiquarian Barði Guðmundsson translated Kylfing to mean "club-wielders". As Foote points out, it can also mean a smaller stick, such as a tally-stick or wooden token used by merchants, and, according to Jesch, it can also mean the "highest and narrowest part" of a ship's stem. Holm discussed the term kylfa in connection with the word hjúkolfr which means "meeting" or "guild"; according to Holm, the second element kolfr could refer to a symbolic arrow traditionally used as a device to summon people for a meeting.

These varied derivations have led to a number of interpretations. Holm offers two meanings: "archer" and "man armed with a cudgel". A number of historians have asserted that Kylfing referred to a member of a "club in the social or Anglo-American sense", a "brotherhood" or a member of a Norse félag. In a number of minor Icelandic manuscripts on mathematics and geography, Kylfingaland is identified as Garðaríki, i.e. Kievan Rus', but the sources are unclear as to whether Kylfingaland is named for the Kylfings or vice versa, or whether, indeed, there is any connection at all.

The Russian cognate of Kylfing is Kolbjag, following the pattern of development *kolƀing (*kulƀing) > *kolƀęg > kolbjag. The Kolbiagi were a group of foreign merchant-venturers and mercenaries mentioned in a number of Old Russian sources. They are often mentioned together with the Varangians, a term used in Eastern Europe to describe traders and pirates of the Baltic sea. In Byzantine Greek, they were named koulpingoi and they served as a unit of the Byzantine army listed alongside the Varangian Guard, which was of Scandinavian origin.

A very different derivation was put forward by the Russian scholar B. Briems. He hypothesised that Kylfingr was a direct Norse translation of the Votic self-designation Vatjalaiset and Vatja (or Vadjalaiset and Vadja) used by the Votes, a Finnic tribe residing in Ingria, Russia. A non-Norse origin was also proposed by Julius Brutzkus, who argued that both Varangian and Kylfing derived from the Turkic languages, particularly the Bulgar and Khazar languages. Brutzkus asserted that Varangian came from the Turkic root varmak ("to walk, travel") while Kylfing was a Norse pronunciation of the Slavic kolbiagi, itself deriving from the Turkic phrase köl-beg ("sea-king"); under this interpretation the word Kylfing would be more or less synonymous with "Viking".

Identity
According to Egil's Saga, the Kylfings were trading and plundering in Finnmark around the year 900. Thorolf Kveldulfsson, King Harald's tax agent in northern Norway, engaged Saami scouts to monitor the Kylfings' movements and report back to him. Countering their raids, he is reported to have killed over a hundred Kylfing marauders.

Some scholars see them as Scandinavians while others consider them to have been a Finnic tribe, and assert a connection between the word Kylfing and the Finnish, Saami, and Karelian myths of Kaleva. Elsewhere they are described as a mixture of Norse and Finnish people who were employed as mercenaries and tax-agents by Scandinavian rulers; in this context Ravndal interpreted the kylfa element to refer to a "club" in the sense of organization. Arbman argues that the Kolbiagi were a separate fur-trading guild. Postan et al., on the other hand, hypothesize that Kolbiag denoted a junior participant in a Varangian trade guild, rather than a separate group.

Finnic peoples
Holm (1992) considers Egil's saga to equate the Kylfings with the Finnic Karelians. In the 14th century, when the Swedish kings began to direct their attention northwards and encourage Swedish colonization in Norrbotten, there were regulations that the Birkarls and the Saami peoples were not to be interrupted in their traditional activities. A large part of the Karelians were under Novgorod which was included in what Icelandic sources called Kylfingaland, and thus the Kylfings could have been Baltic Finnish tribes under Novgorod.

Both East Slavs and Byzantines consistently made a clear distinction between Varangians and Kylfings, and Byzantines distinguished between them in the same manner as they separated Franks from Saracens. According to Holm such separations are indicative of clear ethnic differences between the two groups. Additionally, both East Slavic and Byzantine sources explicitly associate the Varangians with Baltic region, which they called Varangia, and in Arabic, the Baltic Sea was called Bahr Varank, i.e. the "Varangian Sea". There are no comparable connections when they mention the Kylfings. Another difference is the fact that the Byzantine sources connect the word varangoi with rhōs in order to make it clear that the rhōs-varangoi and the varangoi originate in Baltic just like the rhōs, but do not establish the same associations for the koulpingoi.

The Kylfings have also been identified with the Votic people. Carl Christian Rafn, Edgar V. Saks, B. Briem and Sigurður Nordal have proposed Kylfings to have been the Norse name for the Votes. The reason is that the ethnonym Vadja(laiset) can be associated with the word vadja (modern Estonian vai''') which means "stake", "wedge" or "staff", which corresponds to Old Norse kolfr. Vadjalaiset would consequently be translated into Old East Norse as kolfingar, which in Old West Norse (Old Icelandic) would be umlauted as kylfingar. Whereas some native names were Scandinavized, as Rostov into Ráðstofa, the Norse learned of the meaning of other names and translated them, which they did at Volkhov, and in the case of some of the Dniepr rapids. The theory that the Kylfings were Votes has been opposed by Max Vasmer and Stender-Petersen, whereas Holm finds it likely. Holm considers it apparent that the Varangians and the Finnic tribes were able to cooperate well, and he points to the relative ease and stability with which Finland was later integrated as a part of the Swedish kingdom. Jorma Koivulehto, a Finnish linguist, disagrees with the Vote theory and maintains that the Votic name or any other Finnic ethnonym is not etymologically connected with the name Kylfingar.

Estonians have also been identified as Kylfings.

Scandinavians

Barði Guðmundsson identified the Kylfings as an East Scandinavian, possibly Swedish, tribe that infiltrated northern Norway during the late ninth century. Guðmundsson connects the Kylfings with the Germanic Heruli who were active throughout northern Europe and in Italy during the fifth and sixth centuries. According to Guðmundsson, many of these Kylfings may ultimately have emigrated to Iceland during the ninth and tenth centuries. Other scholars have assigned a Danish origin to this tribe.

Some scholars have considered the Kylfings of Egil's Saga to be a "conquering Germanic people", or the Swedish king's tax collectors.  Holm (1992) considers such suggestions to be anachronistic because the Swedish kings lacked any interest in northern Fenno-Scandia during the ninth and tenth centuries, and not even the later law of Hälsingland mentions any Swedish settlement north of Bygdeå in southern Västerbotten.

Pritsak identified the Kylfings as a "professional trading and mercenary organization" that organized expeditions northward, into the Saami lands, as distinct from other Varangian and viking groups whose expeditions focussed on lands to the west and east of Scandinavia. This interpretation is supported by such historians as Stender-Petersen.

A number of runestones in Sweden contain the personal name Kylfingr, which may or may not be connected to the Kylfings as a group.Pritsak 384.

Other suggestions
A few historians have hypothesized that the Kylfings were a West Slavic people related to the Pomeranians. Under this interpretation, the Slavic term Kolbiag may share common origins with such place-names as Kołobrzeg (formerly Kolberg), a town on the Pomeranian Baltic coast, and Kolpino, a settlement near modern St. Petersburg.

Status

Byzantine Empire

Eleventh-century Byzantine sources refer to Kylfings (Κουλπίγγοι, Koulpingoi; often attested in the genitive plural Κουλπίγγων, Koulpingon) as being among the foreigners serving as mercenaries in Constantinople, but appear to distinguish between them and the Varangians.Waldemar Nissen theorized that Koulpiggon and Koulpingoi referred to members of the Germanic or South Slavic Guduscani tribe, who were settled around the Kulpa River in Dalmatia; this view has been largely rejected by historians. Blöndal 82–83 at n. 3. For instance, an imperial chrysobull, an edict bearing a golden seal, issued in 1073 exempts certain monasteries from being forced to billet soldiers of specific ethne: Varangians, Rus', Saracens, Franks and Koulpingoi.  In previous edicts issued in 1060 and 1068 the Koulpingoi had not been separately delineated. Similar edicts were issued in 1082, 1086, and 1088. The edict issued by Alexios I Komnenos 1088, for instance, reads:

Russia and the eastern Baltic
The Kylfings were also active in the eastern Baltic and northern Russia. Kylfingaland may have been used to refer to Karelia; on some runestones it has been interpreted as a synonym for Garðariki, the Old Norse name for Russia.Anderson 521. The eleventh-century Ruskaya Pravda, the law code of the Kievan Rus', grants certain privileges to Kylfings (Колбяги or "Kolbiagi") in addition to Varangians ("Varyagi"). For instance, Varangians and Kylfings were entitled to press charges with an oath without relying on any witnesses. In addition, in order to swear innocence, they needed only two witnesses, whereas a native Slav needed as many as seven. Moreover, the Varangians and the Kylfings were entitled to give shelter to a fugitive for as many as three days, whereas Slavs and others had to hand him over directly.

Hungary
A military organization called Kölpények is reported to have existed in Medieval Hungary during the tenth, eleventh and twelfth centuries. Hungarian scholars have proposed that the Kölpények were identical with the Kylfings/Kolbiagi.Székely 11. Hungarian sources regard the Kölpények as being of Scandinavian origin. They were hired by the early rulers of the House of Arpad, particularly Taksony of Hungary in the 950s, to serve as frontier guards. They fought with their Magyar employers alongside Sviatoslav I of Kiev against Bulgaria and the Byzantine Empire. Alternatively, the Kölpények may have been of Pecheneg origin, as there was a Pecheneg tribal group called Külbej during roughly the same period.

Austkylfur

The skaldic poet Thorbjorn Hornklofi wrote about Austkylfur, or "East-Kylfings", in his epic poem Haraldskvæði. In some manuscripts the name was, probably erroneously, rendered auðkylfur or "rich men". Some philologists, using the nautical meaning of the word kylfa, interpret the phrase as "eastern ships". Others, such as F. Jonsson, interpreted Austkylfur to mean "eastern logs", while Vigfusson believed that the phrase properly meant simply "men of the east".  Another interpretation of the term used in Haraldskvæði is the derogatory "eastern oafs".

Guðmundsson specifically identified the Austkylfur of Hornklofi's poem with the Kylfings mentioned elsewhere in Scandinavian and Eastern European sources, and interpreted the phrase Austkylfur to mean "eastern club-wielding men".

In Haraldskvæði as recorded by Snorri Sturluson in the Heimskringla, the Austrkylfur were described as being opponents of Harald Fairhair at the Battle of Hafrsfjord. As such they formed part of the force, led by Kjotve the Rich of Agder and the kings and jarls of Hordaland, Rogaland, and Telemark, that came to Hafrsfjord to fight Harald's encroaching hegemony. The exact relationship between the Austkylfur and the anti-Harald coalition is unknown. Nora Chadwick identifies the Austkylfur as the part of the force opposing Harald that came from Agder and Telemark. These districts lie further east than the other kingdoms opposing Harald's rule. After their defeat by Harald and his army, the Kylfings' property was plundered and their womenfolk, described as "eastern maidens", were distributed by the victorious king among his warriors.

Timeline

Notes

References

  Anderson, T. "Kylfingar."  in Hoops, Johannes, et al., Reallexikon Der Germanischen Altertumskunde. Walter de Gruyter, 2000. p. 520–522. 
  Anglia: Zeitschrift für englische Philologie. Niemeyer, 1924.
 Arbman, Holger. The Vikings. Praeger, 1961.
 Blöndal, Sigfús and Benedikz, Benedict S. The Varangians of Byzantium. Cambridge Univ. Press, 2007 .
  Brutzkus, Julius. "Warjager und Kolbjager." Acta Seminari Kondakov. 1935.
 Bugge, Sophus. "The Norse Lay of Wayland and its Relation to the English Tradition." The Saga Book of the Viking Club, Vol. II. David Nutt, 1898.
 Chadwick, Nora Kershaw. Anglo-Saxon and Norse Poems. Cambridge Univ. Press, 1922. Originally published under her maiden name.
 Cleasby, Richard and Guðbrandur Vigfusson. An Icelandic-English Dictionary. Clarendon Press, 1874.
 Foote, Peter Godfrey and David Mackenzie Wilson. The Viking Achievement. Praeger, 1970.
 Guðmundsson, Barði. The Origin of the Icelanders. Lee Hollander, transl. Univ. of Nebraska Press, 1967.
 Hastings, John. "Kalevala". Encyclopedia of Religion and Ethics. vol. 7. Charles Scribner's Sons, 1908.
  Kaikamees -- ajalooline aunimi. 1931
  Holm, Gösta. "Kylvingar och Väringar: Etymologiska Problem Kring två Folkgruppsnamn", in Svenska Akademiens Handlingar. - 0349-4543. ; 1992(18), pp. 85–101.
 Jesch, Judith. Ships and Men in the Late Viking Age: The Vocabulary of Runic Inscriptions and Skaldic Verse. Boydell & Brewer, 2008. 
  Jónsson, Finnur, transl. Hrólfs saga Kraka og Bjarkarímur. Copenhagen, S. L. Møllers bogtr., 1904.
Kazhdan, A. P. and Ann Wharton Epstein. Change in Byzantine Culture in the Eleventh and Twelfth Centuries. University of California Press, 1985. 
  "Kölpön." A Pallas Nagy Lexikona. Arcanum Adatbázis Kft, 1998.
Laiou, Angeliki E. and Roy P. Mottahedeh. The Crusades from the Perspective of Byzantium and the Muslim World. Dumbarton Oaks, 2000. 
 Norvin, William. Classica et mediaevalia: revue danoise de philologie et d'histoire. Librairie Gyldendal, 1938.
 Percy, Thomas and Margaret Clunies Ross. The Old Norse Poetic Translations of Thomas Percy: A New Edition and Commentary. Brepols, 2001.
 Postan, M. M., Edward Miller, and H. J. Habakkuk. The Cambridge Economic History of Europe. Cambridge Univ. Press, 1987.
 Pritsak, Omeljan. The Origin of Rus'. Cambridge Mass.: Harvard University Press, 1991.
 Ravndal, Gabriel Bie. Stories of the East-Vikings. Augsburg Publishing House, 1938.
 Scudder, Bernard, transl. "Egil's Saga". Sagas of Icelanders. Penguin, 2001.
 Sootak, Jaan. "Development of Estonian Criminal Law." Juridica International, Vol. 1996-I. pp. 52–53.
 Struminski, Bohdan. Linguistic Interrelations in Early Rus. CIUS Press, 1996.
 Székely, György. Hungary and Sweden: Early Contacts. Akadémiai Kiadó, 1975.
 Vernadsky, George. Medieval Russian Law.'' Columbia Univ. Press, 1961.

History of Karelia
History of Kievan Rus'
Norsemen
Historical ethnic groups of Russia
Medieval Russia
Novgorod Republic